Soe Win is the name of:

 Soe Win (prime minister) (1947–2007), Prime Minister of Burma
 Soe Win (general), deputy commander-in-chief of the Tatmadaw (Myanmar Armed Forces)
 Soe Win (minister) (born 1938), Minister for Planning and Finance of Myanmar (Burma)
 Soe Win (prince) (born 1947), Burmese diplomat
 Soe Win (MP) (born 1957), Burmese politician
 Soe Win (bodyguard) (1961–2020), the bodyguard and close confidant of the State Counsellor of Myanmar, Aung San Suu Kyi